Pir Bakran District is a district (bakhsh) in Falavarjan County, Isfahan Province, Iran. At the 2006 census, its population was 50,417, in 13,687 families.  The District has two cities: Pir Bakran and Baharan Shahr.  The District has two rural districts (dehestan): Garkan-e Shomali Rural District and Sohr va Firuzan Rural District.

References 

Falavarjan County
Districts of Isfahan Province